The House of Tofe Keckarovski is a historical house in Galičnik that is listed as Cultural heritage of North Macedonia. It is in ownership of one branch of the family of Keckarovski.

History of the family

Notable members of the family
 Risto Keckarovski - member and local activist of the League of Communist Youth of Yugoslavia and the Communist Party of Yugoslavia. He was a secretary of one LCYY group.
 Elena Brezoska-Keckaroska ― member and local activist of the League of Communist Youth of Yugoslavia.
 Tofe Keckarovski ― partisan during the World War II in Yugoslav Macedonia.
 Lazar Keckarovski ― local activist in the mid 20th century.

See also
House of Boris and Tomo Bundalevski
House of Ruse Gegovski
House of Iljo Pangovski
Galičnik Wedding Festival

References

External links
 National Register of objects that are cultural heritage (List updated to December 31, 2012) (In Macedonian)
 Office for Protection of Cultural Heritage (In Macedonian)

Galičnik
Cultural heritage of North Macedonia
Historic houses